Gladys Hill (died 1981) was a screenwriter and film executive. She is best known as co-writer of the screenplay for The Man Who Would Be King  for which she received a nomination for the Academy Award for Best Adapted Screenplay. She also co-wrote screenplays for The Kremlin Letter and Reflections in a Golden Eye.

Hill's film career began in 1946 as dialogue director on The Stranger, directed by Orson Welles. She went on to be dialogue director on other films such as John Huston's We Were Strangers in 1949, and The Prowler in 1951 which was directed by Joseph Losey.  In 1962, Hill became head assistant to Director John Huston, a position which continued through 11 more films with Huston. She acted in three movies in the 1960s and 70s. Hill died in 1981.

Bibliography
Reflections in a Golden Eye, 1967
The Kremlin Letter, 1970
The Man Who Would Be King, 1975

Filmography
Actor
The Night of the Iguana, 1964
Winter Kills, 1979
Wise Blood, 1979

Assistant to John Huston
Freud, 1962
The List of Adrian Messenger, 1963
The Night of the Iguana, 1964
The Bible: In the Beginning, 1966
Sinful Davey, 1969
Fat City, 1972
The Life and Times of Judge Roy Bean, 1972
The MacKintosh Man, 1973
Phobia, 1980
Victory, 1981
Annie, 1982

References

External links
 

1981 deaths
American women screenwriters
Year of birth missing
Place of birth missing
Date of death missing
20th-century American women writers
20th-century American screenwriters